Qomsheh-ye Baba Karam Khan (also Romanized as Qomsheh-ye Bābā Karam Khān; also known as Qomsheh-ye Karam Khān) is a village in Mahidasht Rural District, Mahidasht District, Kermanshah County, Kermanshah Province, Iran. At the 2006 census, its population was 99, in 22 families.

References 

Populated places in Kermanshah County